The first round of sanctions was applied in March 2014, after the Russian annexation of Crimea and its support for the War in Donbas. The second active round of applied sanctions started in February 2022, after the full-scale Russian invasion of Ukraine.

List

See also
 Boycott Russian Films
 Do not buy Russian goods!
 International sanctions during the Russo-Ukrainian War
 List of foreign aid to Ukraine during the Russo-Ukrainian War
 Magnitsky Act
 Reactions to the 2022 Russian invasion of Ukraine
 Remember about the Gas – Do not buy Russian goods!
 Russian financial crisis (2014–present)

References

External links
Categorized list including companies "defying demands for exit/reduction of activities", 22 March

Individuals sanctioned during the 2013-15 Ukrainian crisis
2014 in international relations
Annexation of Crimea by the Russian Federation
International sanctions